The Government Maharaja College in Chhatarpur was established in 1865, making it one of the oldest colleges in Madhya Pradesh.

About 
The college celebrated its centenary in 1985-1986 by being the host to the then president of India, Hon. Gyani Jail Singh.

Notable alumni
 N. N. Wanchoo, Ex-Governor of Madhya Pradesh

History 
The college was established as an "Urdu Madarsa" in 1865, then converted into an A.V.M school in 1881. It was made a high school in 1884, affiliated to Calcutta University. In 1887, the school's affiliation shifted to Allahabad University. It was made an intermediate college in 1935, with A.B. Lal as its first principal.

After India's independence, Chhatarpur was merged with Vindhya Pradesh and in 1948 the college was accredited for arts, science and commerce. J K Dasgupta became its first leader as a degree college in 1949. Courses continued to be added, and Maharaja Degree College served as a constituent college of Agra University. The college was accredited for post-graduate degrees in 1957, and affiliation shifted to the University of Sagar. Since 2015, the college has been affiliated with Maharaja Chhatrasal Bundelkhand University in Chhatarpur.

References

External links
 Official Website

Universities and colleges in Madhya Pradesh
Education in Chhatarpur
Educational institutions established in 1865
1865 establishments in India